Jeanine Durning is a choreographer, performer, and teacher based in New York.
Her work has been presented in Amsterdam, Berlin, Zagreb, Toronto, and across the US.

Performance work
 A Good Man Falls (2002)
 Part One Parting (2004)
 half URGE (2004)
 out of the kennel into a home (2006)
 Ex-Memory: waywewere (2009)
 inging (2010)
 To Being (2015)

Awards
 Alpert Awards in the Arts for Dance (2007)
 New York Foundation for the Arts Award
 McKnight Artist Fellowship (2011)
 Movement Research Artist in Residence
 Gibney Dance Dance in Process Resident
 Brooklyn Artists Space Grant (2013/14)

References

Living people
21st-century American women artists
Year of birth missing (living people)